Gerrie Kleton (15 September 1953 – 8 January 2006) was a Dutch professional footballer who played as a midfielder for Ajax, AZ Alkmaar, HFC Haarlem, RKC Waalwijk and Cercle Brugge. He was a member of the Haarlem team, that competed in the UEFA Cup in the 1982–83 season, for the first time in the club's history. However this campaign was to be overshadowed by the Luzhniki disaster.

Death
Kleton died in January 2006 after a long illness. He was 52 years old and survived by his wife and two daughters.

References

External links
  Obituary KNVB
 Ajax career stats - Ajax

1953 births
2006 deaths
Dutch footballers
Footballers from Amsterdam
Association football midfielders
AZ Alkmaar players
HFC Haarlem players
RKC Waalwijk players
AFC Ajax players
Cercle Brugge K.S.V. players
Eredivisie players
Belgian Pro League players
Dutch expatriate footballers
Dutch expatriate sportspeople in Belgium
Expatriate footballers in Belgium